In March 1984, a serious radiation accident occurred in Morocco, at the Mohammedia power plant, where eight people died from pulmonary hemorrhaging caused by overexposure to radiation from a lost iridium-192 source. Other individuals also received significant overdoses of radiation that required medical attention. Three people were sent to the Curie Institute in Paris for treatment of radiation poisoning.

The source was used to radiograph welds and became separated from its shielded container. As the source, an iridium pellet, itself had no markings indicating it was radioactive, a worker took it home, where it stayed for some weeks, exposing the family to radiation. The laborer, his family, and some relatives were the eight deaths caused by the accident.

See also
 Nuclear and radiation accidents
 Goiânia accident
 Radiotherapy accident in Costa Rica
 Radiotherapy accident in Zaragoza

References

External links
 
 Description of the incident in Johnston's Archive

Man-made disasters in Morocco
1984 industrial disasters
Morocco
1984 in Morocco
March 1984 events in Africa
1984 disasters in Morocco